Anthony Paul Moore (born 7 February 1943) is an English former professional footballer who played as a striker in the Football League for York City, in non-League football for Heworth, Bridlington Trinity and Selby Town.

References

1943 births
Living people
Footballers from York
English footballers
Association football forwards
York City F.C. players
Bridlington Trinity F.C. players
Selby Town F.C. players
English Football League players